Trees & Truths is the third mixtape by American rapper Mick Jenkins. It was released on April 25, 2013. As of June 2020, it has been downloaded over 64,000 times on DatPiff.

Background 
Jenkins described Trees & Truths as his "most lyrical work" and explained the significance of the mixtape's title to its content: "It's a description of topics I view as truth and how they are affected by 'The trees’, the trees being weed, the tree of the knowledge of good and evil, and a representation of people." The mixtape features fellow Chicago rappers Saba and Noname, along with Jean Deaux and SolarFive. Producers that contributed to the mixtape include OnGaud, Saba, Ohbliv, Mark Gee, Such N Such, Nick Peacock and Plain and Simple.

Track listing

References 

2013 mixtape albums